The 2019 CrossFit Games was the 13th iteration of the annual competition in the sport CrossFit held from August 1–4, 2019, at the Alliant Energy Center in Madison, Wisconsin, United States. The men's competition was won by Mat Fraser, the women's by Tia-Clair Toomey, and CrossFit Mayhem Freedom won the Team competition, all of whom also won the 2018 games.

The 2019 Games operated under a new set of qualification rules this year, allowing athletes to qualify for the Games via three different methods: the Open, the Sanctionals and invitations, replacing the Regionals of previous seasons.  It was also the first year to allow a team to be composed of members who did not share a gym affiliation, thereby removing the Affiliate Cup. This year the Games was not broadcast on ESPN or CBS, but rather streamed online by various partners using an open-source broadcast.

This year's Games was the largest yet in the Games' history with the introduction of national champions from 114 countries who can qualify for the Games. The field, however, was quickly reduced to 10 men and 10 women in a series of cuts. Toomey put in a dominant display to win the women's compeitin by 195 points over Kristin Holte. The men's competition was tightly fought between Fraser and Noah Ohlsen, with Ohlsen leading in many events and Fraser only pulling ahead to win in the final two events.  Fraser's fourth consecutive win equaled Rich Froning Jr.'s record, while Toomey's win was the first time a woman has achieved three consecutive wins.

Qualification 
For this season, the Games qualification procedures were overhauled. For the first year since 2008, the CrossFit Games no longer hosted a regional qualifier and instead sanctioned independently run events around the world. The events were trademarked as "Sanctionals" by CrossFit, and were used to qualify participants in the Men, Women, and Team divisions for the 2019 Games. In previous years the CrossFit Open was used to determine which athletes and teams qualified for the Regionals. In 2019, each Sanctional was either by invitation or through its own open qualification process. The CrossFit Open still occurred, but was used to qualify directly to the Games. Team rules were also changed so that members no longer needed to be from the same CrossFit affiliate and a team can be composed of the best athletes from different affiliates (hence dubbed the "superteam"), there was therefore also no Affiliate Cup which was awarded to an affiliate in previous year.

Individual athletes qualified for the 2019 CrossFit Games in one of four ways by order of precedence: becoming a national champion in the 2019 CrossFit Open, finishing in the top 20 men or women worldwide in the Open, winning a Sanctionals event, or by select invitation at the Games' discretion.

Open
The first set of qualified athletes were the men or women who finished top 20 worldwide in the Open, as well as the top-ranked man and woman in the Open from each country with at least one CrossFit affiliate in good standing, and who had completed each Open workout as written in the Rx'd (prescribed) category after video review. 357,000 athletes registered for the Open, a drop of 14% from the 2018 Games.  The Open took place over five weeks starting on February 21; after the Open was completed, a total of 123 men and 117 women qualified for the Games as national champions pending final review. After the national champions were determined, the next 20 overall male and female worldwide finishers in the Open qualified for the Games. Mat Fraser and Sara Sigmundsdóttir were the overall winners of the Open.

Sanctionals
The 2019 Sanctionals consisted of 15 sanctioned events that took place between December 2018 and June 2019. The events were the Dubai CrossFit Championship (Dubai), Australian CrossFit Championship (Broadbeach), Wodapalooza (Miami), CrossFit Fittest in Cape Town, CrossFit Strength in Depth (London), Asia CrossFit Championship (Shanghai), Mid-Atlantic CrossFit Challenge (Baltimore), CrossFit Italian Showdown (Milan), Brazil CrossFit Championship (São Paulo), CrossFit Lowlands Throwdown (Apeldoorn), Down Under CrossFit Championship (Wollongong), Reykjavik CrossFit Championship (Reykjavik), Rogue Invitational (Columbus, Ohio), CrossFit French Throwdown (Paris), and the Granite Games (St. Cloud, Minnesota). 

Unlike the Regionals of previous years where the events were standardised, each Sanctional devised its own separate workouts, which may vary in number from six to twelve workouts. The male, female, and team winners of each of the events qualified for the Games and if a Sanctionals event winner has previously qualified for the 2019 CrossFit Games, the qualifying place for that competition would be awarded to the next highest finisher who has yet to qualify for the games.

Invitations
The final method of qualification allowed for the CrossFit Games to issue four at-large bids. No other details were provided by the CrossFit Games rulebook, but invitations were given to professional obstacle course racer Hunter McIntyre and ten-time CrossFit Games competitor Ben Smith following social media campaigns.

Individual
Following the qualification procedure, there were 148 men and 134 women that had qualified for the CrossFit Games in the Individual competition (143 men and 117 women turned up at the Games). In the previous 4 Games, no athletes were cut during the competition; this year due to the significantly higher number of participants, the Games implemented cuts after each of the first 6 events. The field was cut to 75 competitors after the first event, and 50 competitors after the second. 10 athletes were then cut for each subsequent event until only 10 remained after the Sprint Course on Saturday. The scoring for each event was adjusted after the cuts so that there would be greater point difference in later events than in the earlier events (wins were therefore more advantageous in later events).  The drastic nature of the cuts and how early the athletes were cut proved controversial as many podium finishers of previous Games such as Sara Sigmundsdottir, Samantha Briggs, Annie Thorisdottir, Patrick Vellner, Brent Fikowski, and Ben Smith failed to reach the later stages of the competition.

Thursday, August 1, 2019

Event 1: First Cut
Four rounds for time of:
400-meter run
Three legless rope climbs
Seven squat snatches

The event was won by both defending champions, Mat Fraser and Tia-Clair Toomey.

Event 2: Second Cut
Fraser won the men's event again, while Danielle Brandon won the women's side.

Friday, August 2, 2019

Event 3: Ruck
Competitors ran four laps around a  course carrying a weighted rucksack. The weight increased by  each lap, from 20 pounds on the first lap to 50 pounds on the last. Lukas Högberg and Emily Rolfe won the event.  A bag fell out of Mat Fraser's rucksack near the end of the 6 km run without his being aware of it, which led to a penalty of 60 seconds, dropping his position in the event from 6th to 17th.

Event 4: Sprint Couplet
 sled push
Bar muscle-ups; 18 for men and 15 for women
 sled push

The competitors started the event by pushing a sled, then completing the required number of muscle-ups on a pull-up bar, and then finished with another sled push to the finish line. The event was won by Matt McLeod and Amanda Barnhart.

Event 5: Mary
As many repetitions as possible in 20 minutes of:
Five handstand push-ups
Ten alternating single-leg squats
Fifteen pull-ups

A traditional CrossFit workout, the competitors performed five handstand push-ups, then ten squats, followed by fifteen pull-ups. After the pull-ups, they started back at the handstand push-ups and repeated the order until the 20 minute mark. The event was won by Noah Ohlsen, who took the overall lead from Mat Fraser with this win, and Kari Pearce.

Saturday, August 3, 2019

Event 6: Sprint Course
Three-round bracket elimination sprint course. In heats of five, competitors ran through a course. The top ten in the first round advanced to the second round, and then the top five in the second round moved on to the final run. Saxon Panchick and Kristin Holte won the event.

Following the event, only the final ten competitors participated in the remainder of the competition.

Event 7: Split Triplet
Five rounds as fast as possible of:
Peg board ascent
100 double-unders
10 single-arm dumbbell split snatches
10 single-arm dumbbell clean and split jerks

Mat Fraser and Tia-Clair Toomey won the event.

Event 8: Clean
The event consisted of progressively heavier weights that each competitor must clean. The time to complete the five lifts and run to a finish line was the tie-breaker score.

Sunday, August 4, 2019

Event 9: Swim Paddle
A  swim to a buoy in Lake Monona and back to shore, then immediately grabbing a paddleboard for a 1,000-meter paddle on the same course. The event was won by Matt McLeod and Tia-Clair Toomey.

Events 10 and 11: Ringer 1 and 2
Ringer 1
Air Bike for 30 calories
30 toes-to-rings
Air bike for 20 calories
20 toes-to-rings
Air bike for 10 calories
10 toes-to-rings

Ringer 2
15 burpees to ring touch
15 overhead squats
10 burpees to ring touch
10 overhead squats
5 burpees to ring touch
5 overhead squats

Ringer 1 and Ringer 2 were separately scored events, with Ringer 2 starting seven minutes after the start of Ringer 1 (time-capped 6 minutes). In Ringer 1, the competitors alternated between riding an air-resistance stationary bicycle and repetitions of hanging from gymnastic rings and touching their toes to the rings. In Ringer 2, the athletes alternated between completing burpees and jumping up to touch the rings as a target and overhead squats with a barbell. Katrín Davíðsdóttir won both women's events, while James Newbury won Ringer 1 and Mat Fraser won Ringer 2 for the men. Fraser retook the overall lead from Ohlsen by 25 points after his win.

Event 12: The Standard
30 clean and jerks
30 ring muscle-ups
30 snatches

For the final event, a combination of three standard CrossFit workouts were done back-to-back-to-back: "Grace" (30 clean and jerks), muscle-ups, and "Isabel" (30 snatches). The event was won both Mat Fraser and Tia-Clair Toomey, who also both repeated as CrossFit Games champions.

Team events
Teams were cut to 11 after Strongman's Fear, 9 after Sprint Relay, 7 after Big Chipper, 5 after Swim Paddle.
 Assault to Bob
 Rope Worm
 Clean and Jerk
 Team Ruck
 Team Strongman's Fear
 Sprint Relay
 Big Chipper
 Team Swim Paddle
 The Trio

Podium finishers

Individuals and teams

Masters men

Masters women

Teens

References

External links
 2019 CrossFit Games Individual events on CrossFit Games official YouTube channel
 2019 CrossFit Games

International sports competitions hosted by the United States
CrossFit
CrossFit Games
CrossFit Games
CrossFit Games
CrossFit Games